Admiralteysky Municipal Okrug is a municipal okrug of Admiralteysky District of the federal city of St. Petersburg, Russia. Population:  

It borders the Neva River in the north, New Admiralty Canal and Kryukov Canal in the west, Fontanka in the south, and Voznesensky Avenue and the Moyka River in the east.

Places of interest include the Admiralty building, Saint Isaac's Cathedral, Mariinsky Palace, Decembrists Square, and Mariinsky Theatre.

References

Admiralteysky District, Saint Petersburg